"Shitty Future" is a song by the Los Angeles-based punk rock band The Bronx, released as the second single from their 2006 album The Bronx.

While the album was released by the Island Def Jam Music Group and the band's own label White Drugs, the singles for all of their albums have been released exclusively in the United Kingdom, through Wichita Recordings. The single was released on both compact disc and 7-inch vinyl, the latter pressed on black vinyl with a foil-stamped cover and limited to 1,500 copies. The B-side track is a demo version of "Dirty Leaves", another song from the album. The cover artwork was designed by guitarist Joby J. Ford.

The music video for "Shitty Future" consists of a montage of live footage of the band performing the song in concert.

Track listing

CD version

Vinyl version

Personnel

Band
 Matt Caughthran – lead vocals
 Joby J. Ford – guitar, backing vocals, artwork and design
 James Tweedy – bass guitar, backing vocals
 Jorma Vik – drums

Production
 Michael Beinhorn – producer, recording
 Ross Hogarth – recording
 Nick Paige – recording assistant
 Mike Shipley – mixing engineer
 Brian Wolgemuth – mixing assistant
 Karl Egsieker – engineer

See also
The Bronx discography

References

The Bronx (band) songs
2006 singles
Song recordings produced by Michael Beinhorn
2006 songs